Bryan Eric Ivie (born May 5, 1969 in Torrance, California) is a former American volleyball player, who was a member of the United States men's national volleyball team that won the bronze medal at the 1992 Summer Olympics in Barcelona, Spain.

References

1969 births
Living people
American men's volleyball players
Volleyball players at the 1992 Summer Olympics
Volleyball players at the 1996 Summer Olympics
Olympic bronze medalists for the United States in volleyball
Sportspeople from California
Medalists at the 1992 Summer Olympics
Pan American Games silver medalists for the United States
Pan American Games medalists in volleyball
Volleyball players at the 1995 Pan American Games
Medalists at the 1995 Pan American Games
USC Trojans men's volleyball players